World League may refer to:
 World League of American Football, which later became NFL Europa
 FIH Hockey World League, an international field hockey competition
 FIVB Volleyball World League, a men's volleyball competition
 FINA Water Polo World League, a water polo competition